Sir Selwyn Charles Cornelius-Wheeler  (26 March 1923 – 4 July 2008) was a British journalist and broadcaster. Having joined the BBC in 1947, he became the corporation's longest-serving foreign correspondent, remaining in the role until his death. Wheeler also had spells as presenter of several BBC current affairs television programmes including Newsnight and Panorama.

Early life
Wheeler was born in Bremen, Germany, in 1923, to Winifred Agnes (née Rees) and Charles Cornelius-Wheeler. The family later moved to Hamburg, where his father was an agent for a shipping company. Educated at the Cranbrook School in Kent, his first job was as an errand boy at the Daily Sketch newspaper at the age of 17. He enlisted in the Royal Marines in 1942, rising to the rank of captain.

As part of 30 Assault Unit, a secret naval intelligence unit assembled by Ian Fleming, he participated in the Normandy landings as second-in-command to Patrick Dalzel-Job.

Career
After leaving the Royal Marines in 1947, Wheeler joined the BBC, initially as a sub-editor at the Latin American division of the World Service. Wheeler's long career as a foreign correspondent began with a three-year posting to Berlin in 1950, partly thanks to his fluency in German. He returned to the UK and became a producer on the fledgling current affairs series Panorama in 1956. As part of Panorama'''s team, he travelled to Hungary to cover what would become known as the Hungarian Uprising. Taking Panorama's camera into the country, despite being told not to, he filmed the jubilant Hungarian reaction to the rebellion.  He and the Panorama producer (and his then wife) Catherine Freeman had to persuade the BBC to give the story prominence. Just hours after Wheeler returned to Britain, Russia re-entered Hungary and crushed the revolt.

Having declined an offer to become the programme's editor, he was later assigned to New Delhi (where he reported extensively on the 1959 Tibetan uprising). He returned to Berlin when the Wall was built and remained there for several years with his Indian-born second wife. Between 1965 and 1973 he moved to Washington DC, where he covered the American Civil Rights Movement and the Watergate scandal. In the later years of his television career he was the American correspondent of Newsnight. Wheeler was the first presenter of BBC World's Dateline London discussion programme. He remained active in his later years as a presenter of documentary series on Radio 4 and a contributor to the network's From Our Own Correspondent. He had been working on a programme about the Dalai Lama until a few weeks before his death.

Legacy
Following Wheeler's death, the British Journalism Review'' established the Charles Wheeler Award for Outstanding Contribution to Broadcast Journalism, which is presented annually at a conference co-hosted by the publication and the University of Westminster. Winners of the award to date are Jeremy Paxman, Jeremy Bowen, Lindsey Hilsum and Allan Little.

Personal life
Wheeler was twice married: his first marriage was to the BBC producer Catherine Freeman and his second marriage, in 1962, was to Dip Singh with whom he had two daughters: barrister Marina Wheeler (the former wife of British prime minister Boris Johnson) and Shirin Wheeler, the BBC's former Brussels correspondent. Wheeler was appointed a Companion of the Order of St Michael and St George in 2001, and was knighted in the 2006 Birthday Honours, for services to broadcasting and journalism overseas.

In June 2006, Wheeler announced he had discovered that a painting by Alessandro Allori of Eleonora of Toledo, the wife of Cosimo de' Medici, which had been given to him in Berlin as a wedding present in 1952, had been looted during the Second World War. Via the Commission for Looted Art in Europe it was returned to its legitimate owner, the Gemäldegalerie of Berlin, from whose possession it had been absent since 1944.

Wheeler died of lung cancer at his home in Warnham, Sussex on 4 July 2008. He was 85 years old.

References

External links
 Leigh Holmwood, Veteran BBC foreign correspondent Charles Wheeler, 85, dies The Guardian, 4 July 2008
 A Tribute to Charles Wheeler BBC Newsnight

1923 births
2008 deaths
BBC newsreaders and journalists
BBC World News
British male journalists
Companions of the Order of St Michael and St George
Knights Bachelor
Deaths from lung cancer in England
Panorama (British TV programme)
Royal Marines personnel of World War II
Royal Marines Commando officers
People educated at Cranbrook School, Kent
People from Warnham
British expatriates in Germany